The three-lined balsa moth (Balsa tristrigella) is a species of moth of the family Noctuidae. It is found in eastern North America.

Adults have light gray forewings, shading to brownish in the distal third. There are several thin black lines running longitudinally along the wing, becoming thicker in the distal half. The hindwings are pale yellowish-gray with a thin dark terminal line. They are on wing from May to August.

The larvae feed on Crataegus species.

References

External links
mothphotographersgroup

Moths described in 1866
Hadeninae
Moths of North America